Elmer Söderblom (born 5 July 2001) is a Swedish professional ice hockey left winger currently playing for the Grand Rapids Griffins in the American Hockey League (AHL) as a prospect to the Detroit Red Wings of the National Hockey League (NHL). Söderblom was drafted 159th overall by the Red Wings in the 2019 NHL Entry Draft.

Playing career
During the 2019–20 season, he led Frölunda HC J20 in scoring with 55 points and 29 goals in 36 games. Söderblom made his professional debut for Frölunda HC of the SHL during the 2019–20 season, where he appeared in 10 games while on loan. During the 2020–21 season, he recorded three goals and two assists in 28 games for Frölunda.

On 9 June 2022, Söderblom was signed by the Detroit Red Wings to a three-year, entry-level contract. On 14 October, Söderblom scored his first career NHL goal against Jake Allen of the Montreal Canadiens in his NHL debut. This first goal, which occurred in the 3rd period, proved to be game-winner and earned him the first star of the game.

Personal life
Elmer's older brother, Arvid, is a professional ice hockey goaltender for the Chicago Blackhawks.

International play

Söderblom represented Sweden at the 2021 World Junior Ice Hockey Championships.

Career statistics

Regular season and playoffs

International

References

External links
 

2001 births
Living people
Detroit Red Wings draft picks
Detroit Red Wings players
Frölunda HC players
Ice hockey people from Gothenburg
Grand Rapids Griffins players
Swedish ice hockey right wingers
Tingsryds AIF players